Alosa algeriensis, the North African shad, is a Mediterranean species of clupeid fish in the shad genus Alosa.

Location
Alosa algeriensis is primarily found in the Mediterranean Sea from northern Morocco to northern Tunisia. They are also found in Sardinia, Italy with landlocked populations in Lake Ichkeul, Tunisia and  Sardinia, Italy.

Biology and life cycle
Alosa algeriensis males will begin upriver migration at about 3–4 years old while females do not begin until about 4–5 years old. The juveniles migrate to the mouth of rivers until they mature. Once temperatures rise above 20 degrees Celsius, they will begin their spawn. Mortality usually occurs after spawning. Mortality after spawning is very common in species of the genus Alosa. This is primarily around the month of May.

References

algeriensis
Fish of the Mediterranean Sea
Marine fish of Africa
Fish of North Africa
Fish described in 1916